National Ethnographic Museum may refer to:

 National Ethnographic Museum (Berat), Albania
 National Ethnographic Museum (Guinea-Bissau)